Huinong District (Xiao'erjing:	خُوِنْو ٿِيُوِ) is a district of the city of Shizuishan, in the northernmost part of the Ningxia Hui Autonomous Region of the People's Republic of China, bordering Inner Mongolia to the northwest, north, and east. It has a total area of 1088 square kilometers, and a population of approximately 200,000 people.

Characteristics

Huinong District was created from the merger of the former Shizuishan county level city and Huinong County. It is an extremely well known agricultural area, and agricultural products and dehydrated vegetables make up the main part of the district's output. The district is the largest grower and processor of dehydrated vegetables in western China. The district's postal code is 753600.

Administrative divisions
Huinong District has 6 subdistricts 3 towns and 1 township.
6 subdistricts
 Beijie
 Zhongjie
 Nanjie
 Yucailu
 Huochezhan
 Hebin

3 towns
 Yuanyi
 Weizha
 Hongguozi

1 township
 Lihe

County-level divisions of Ningxia
Shizuishan